Hemi may refer to:

People

Surname
 Jack Hemi (1914–1996), New Zealand freezing worker, rugby union and league player, shearer
 Ronald Hemi (1933–2000), New Zealand rugby union player

Given name
 Hemi Bawa, Indian painter and sculptor
 Hemi Baxter, also known as James K. Baxter
 Hemi Doron (born 1956), Israeli politician
 Hemi Pititi Huata (1867–1954), New Zealand tribal leader and Anglican clergyman
 Hemi Pomara (born 1830), Māori chief
 Hemi Potatau (1904–1994), New Zealand Presbyterian minister, soldier, writer
 Hemi Taylor (born 1963), Wales rugby union player
 Hemi Topine Te Mamaku ( 1790–1887), Māori chief

Places
 Hemi Station, Japan

Vehicles
 Hemispherical combustion chamber
 Donovan hemi, an engine of this type
 Chrysler Hemi engine, an engine of this type
 Dodge Super 8 Hemi, a car with the Chrysler Hemi engine

Other
 hemi, prefix meaning "half"
 Hemi group, involved in Illinois v. Hemi Group LLC

See also
 Semi (disambiguation)
 Demi (disambiguation)